Torpedo Sofia is an ice hockey team in Sofia, Bulgaria. They played one season (2007–08) in the Bulgarian Hockey League.

History
The club was founded in 2006 and took part in the Bulgarian Amateur League during the 2006–07 season. For the 2007-08 season, the club joined the Bulgarian Hockey League, participating in Group B. They finished last in the group after failing to win a game. Torpedo joined the Balkan League, which also consisted of teams from Greece, for the 2008–09 season. They finished in last place with a record of one win, 10 losses, and one tie. They returned to the Balkan League for the 2009–10 season, but again finished in last place, this time failing to record a victory. After sitting out the 2011 and 2012 seasons, Torpedo returned to the Balkan League for the 2012–13 season. They finished in first place in Group B of the league.

References

External links
Team profile on eurohockey.net

Bulgarian Hockey League teams
Ice hockey teams in Bulgaria